"MCMXIV" (1914) is a poem written by English poet Philip Larkin.  It was  first published in the book The Whitsun Weddings in 1964. The poem, a single sentence spread over four stanzas, begins by describing what is seemingly a photograph of volunteers lining up to enlist, and goes on to reflect on the momentous changes in England that would result from the First World War, ending, 'Never such innocence again'.

References in popular culture
 The first and last lines of the poem are quoted in the film The History Boys.
 MCMXIV is the first single on the Portland, Oregon band Archeology's E.P. Change of Address
 MCMXIV is a single from Chicago, Illinois band Ratboys' album "AOID"

See also
List of poems by Philip Larkin

References
 Philip Larkin, Collected Poems, Faber and Faber, 2003, Appendix III.

External links
 The Philip Larkin Society

Poetry by Philip Larkin
1964 poems